The Petroleum Act 1862 (25 & 26 Vict c 66) is an Act of the Parliament of the United Kingdom for the safe-keeping of petroleum.

Background 
The large-scale production of petroleum began in the United States in 1859 from oil wells in Pennsylvania. Within two years petroleum was being imported into the UK. It was estimated that in the year 1862 about 9 million gallons (40,915 m3) of petroleum oil was imported from the United States. Concerns about the safe storage of petroleum and some of its flammable products, and the associated risks of fire and explosion, led to the passing of the UK's first Petroleum Act in 1862.

Petroleum Act 1862 
The Petroleum Act 1862 (25 & 26 Vict. c. 66) received royal assent on 29 July 1862. Its preamble reads ‘whereas it is expedient to provide for the safe-keeping of petroleum and certain products thereof that are dangerous to life and property, from their properties of giving off inflammable vapours at low temperatures.’

Provisions 
The Act comprises 10 sections:

 Section 1. Definitions: petroleum; borough; harbour; harbour authority. Petroleum and any relevant product were defined as that which gives off inflammable (flammable) vapour at a temperature of less than 100 °F (37.8 °C).
 Section 2. Regulations to be observed by a ship carrying petroleum
 Section 3. Regulations to be observed in storing petroleum. No more than 40 gallons (182 litres) of petroleum shall be stored within 50 yards (46 metres) of a house or a building where goods are stored, without a licence.
 Section 4. Definition of local authority
 Section 5. Mode of granting licences
 Section 6. In case of refusal of licence, the applicant may memorialize the Secretary of State
 Section 7. Forfeiture and penalties in England and Ireland
 Section 8. Recovery of forfeiture and penalties in Scotland
 Section 9. Search for petroleum
 Section 10. Reservation of previous powers with respect to inflammable substances

Aftermath 
Following the passage of the Act local authorities placed advertisements in local newspapers to inform keepers of petroleum of the provisions and consequences of the 1862 Act. These included: that no more than 40 gallons may be stored; that none should be kept within 50 yards of a dwelling house or a building used as a store; that sellers of petroleum should hold a license issued by the local authority. For example, the Metropolitan Board of Works placed adverts to this effect in the London Daily News on 9, 16 and 23 October 1862.  Traders also placed advertisements identifying that they had obtained a licence.

The demand for petroleum continued to grow; the trade was mainly based in London and Liverpool. In 1869 it was estimated that there were 780,000 gallons (3,546 m3) of petroleum stored in London.

The original Petroleum Act of 1862 was found to be defective. A Parliamentary Committee on Fire Protection was established in 1867, to 'inquire into the existing legislative provisions for the protection of life and property against fires in the United Kingdom, and as to the best means for ascertaining the causes and preventing the frequency of fires'. Evidence given to the committee indicated that the Petroleum Act 1862 was inoperative; one of the committee's four recommendation was that the existing law should be amended to correct this deficiency. This was enacted through the provisions of the Petroleum Act 1868.

The Petroleum Act 1862 was repealed by the Petroleum Act 1871 (Section 17).

See also 

 Petroleum Act

References
Rickards, George Kettilby. The Statutes of the United Kingdom of Great Britain and Ireland, 25 & 26 Victoria, 1862. Pages 331 to 335
Woolrych, Edmund Humphrey. The Metropolis Local Management Acts. Shaw and Sons. Fetter Lane, London. 1863. Pages 535 to 539
Glen, William Cunningham. Shelford's Law of Railways. Fourth Edition. Butterworths. London. 1869. Volume 1. Pages 255 to 258.

United Kingdom Acts of Parliament 1862
History of the petroleum industry in the United Kingdom